The Golden Hind is a named passenger train operating between London Paddington and  in the United Kingdom.

History
The Golden Hind was introduced by British Rail on 15 June 1964. The inaugural train was waved off from Paddington by Admiral Sir Royston Wright, Second Sea Lord and the whistle was blown by the Lord Mayor of Plymouth.

The up service departed Plymouth at 07:05, calling at Newton Abbot, Exeter and Taunton, arriving at Paddington at 10:55. The down service was from Paddington at 17:20, calling at the same places and arriving in Plymouth at 21:15. Seven coaches were provided, including a restaurant car, but the introduction of Western diesel locomotives allowed the addition of an extra coach. The provision of this train encouraged a passenger to purchase the first, first class season ticket from Taunton to London Paddington.

, the Golden Hind is still being run by Great Western Railway as the 05:05 from Penzance to Paddington, returning at 18:03 from Paddington to Penzance.

References

Named passenger trains of British Rail
Railway services introduced in 1964
1964 establishments in England